Elvis Antonio Peguero (born March 20, 1997) is a Dominican professional baseball pitcher for the Milwaukee Brewers of Major League Baseball (MLB). He was signed as an international free agent by the New York Yankees in 2016 and made his MLB debut with the Los Angeles Angels in 2021.

Professional career

New York Yankees
The New York Yankees signed Peguero as an international free agent on July 2, 2015. Peguero spent the 2016 season with the Dominican Summer League Yankees. He went 2–7 with a 4.39 ERA and 43 strikeouts. Peguero was assigned to the Gulf Coast League Yankees to begin the 2017 season. After making 7 appearances, going 1–1 with an ERA of 3.00 with 5 strikeouts for the GCL Yankees, he was optioned back to the DSL Yankees, where he struggled to an 0–3 record with a 8.76 ERA with 16 strikeouts through 3 starts. Peguero spent the entire 2018 season with the GCL Yankees, where he made 9 appearances, going 0–3 with a 6.25 ERA and 23 strikeouts. Peguero spent the 2019 season with the Pulaski Yankees. He made 15 appearances for Pulaski, going 2–2 with a 4.19 ERA and 29 strikeouts. Peguero did not play in 2020 due to the COVID-19 pandemic. He began the 2021 season with the High-A Hudson Valley Renegades. He made 15 appearances for Hudson Valley, going 3–1 with a 2.51 ERA and 40 strikeouts. On July 6, 2021, Peguero was assigned to the Double-A Somerset Patriots. In 6 appearances for Somerset, he went 1–0 with a 1.50 ERA and 17 strikeouts.

Los Angeles Angels
On July 30, 2021, Peguero and Janson Junk were traded to the Los Angeles Angels in exchange for Andrew Heaney. The Angels assigned him to the Double-A Rocket City Trash Pandas, where he made four appearances, going 1–1 with an 8.44 ERA and eight strikeouts. On August 19, he was promoted to the Triple-A Salt Lake Bees. Peguero only made one appearance for Salt Lake, pitching two scoreless innings. On August 25, the Angels selected Peguero's contract. He made his major-league debut on August 26 against the Baltimore Orioles, getting two outs and giving up five runs. On September 17, Peguero was removed from the 40-man roster and returned to Triple-A. Peguero was re-selected to the 40-man roster following the season on November 19, 2021.

Milwaukee Brewers
On November 22, 2022, the Angels traded Peguero, Janson Junk, and Adam Seminaris to the Milwaukee Brewers for Hunter Renfroe.

References

External links

1997 births
Living people
People from Cotuí
Major League Baseball players from the Dominican Republic
Major League Baseball pitchers
Los Angeles Angels players
Dominican Summer League Yankees players
Gulf Coast Yankees players
Pulaski Yankees players
Hudson Valley Renegades players
Somerset Patriots players
Rocket City Trash Pandas players
Salt Lake Bees players